The following is a list of Portuguese singers in alphabetical order.

A
Adolfo Luxúria Canibal
Adelaide Ferreira
Adriano Correia de Oliveira
Alfredo Marceneiro
Amália Rodrigues
Amélia Muge
Anabela
António Calvário
Aurea
Agir
April Ivy
Ana Moura
António Zambujo
Angélico Vieira
António Variações
Alexandra Solnado
André Sardet
Ana da Silva
António Avelar de Pinho
Armando Gama
Ana Free

B
Bárbara Bandeira
Beatriz da Conceição
Beto

C
Carmen Susana Simões
Carlos Quintas
Carlos Paião
Carlos Mendes
Camané
Carminho
Cândida Branca Flor
Carlos do Carmo
Cláudia Pascoal
Conan Osiris
Cristina Branco

D
Daniela Varela
David Carreira
David Fonseca
Dengaz
Diogo Piçarra
Diana Lucas
Dina
Dora
Duarte Mendes
Diana Piedade
Dulce Pontes

E
Elisabete Matos
Eugénia Melo e Castro
Eduardo Nascimento

F
Fernando Daniel
Fernando Maurício
Fernando Machado Soares
Filipa Azevedo
Filipa Sousa
Filipe Pinto
Fernando Tordo

G
Gisela João
Germano Rocha
Guida Costa

H
Henrique Feist
Herman José

I
Inês Thomas Almeida
Isaura

J
João Pedro Pais
Jorge Palma
Joaquim Pimentel
João Loureiro
Jorge Chaminé
José Cid
JP Simões
João Maria Tudela
Jennifer Smith
José Carlos Xavier

K
Katia Guerreiro

L
Lata Gouveia
Lena d'Água
Lúcia Moniz
Luciana Abreu
Lura
Lula Pena
Lomelino Silva
Linda de Suza
Luísa Todi
Luísa Sobral
Luís Goes

M
Mariza
Marco Matias
Maria Armanda
Mafalda Arnauth
Mickael Carreira
Manuela Azevedo
Maurizio Bensaude
Manuela Bravo
Maria João
Madalena Iglésias
Miguel Guedes
Miguel Gameiro
Malvina Garrigues
Mazgani
Milú
Mimicat
Mísia
Maria Guinot
Mafalda Veiga
Monica Sintra
Maximiano de Sousa (Max)
Marco Ventura
Maria Severa-Onofriana
Maria Teresa de Noronha
Manuel Freire
Murta

N
Nelly Furtado
Nuno Resende
Nuno Roque
Nucha
Nuno Bettencourt

P
Paulo Gonzo
Paulo Sousa
Pedro Abrunhosa
Paulo Alexandre
Pilar Homem de Melo
Piruka
Paulo de Carvalho
Patrícia Candoso
Padre José Luís Borga
Paulo Brissos
Plutónio

Q
Quim Barreiros

R
Regina Pacini
Rui Drumond
Roberto Leal
Rita Redshoes
Rui Reininho
Rouxinol Faduncho
Richie Campbell
Raquel Tavares
Rui Veloso
Raquel Guerra
Rita Guerra
Rui Bandeira

S
Sara Tavares
Sabrina
Simone de Oliveira
Susana Gaspar
Sérgio Godinho
Sam the Kid
Sofia Vitória
Slimmy
Sara Braga Simões
Suzy
Salvador Sobral
Sofia Lisboa
Susana Félix
Suspiria Franklyn

T
TAY
Teresa Salgueiro
Tó Cruz
Tonicha
Tiago Bettencourt
Tony Carreira

V
Valete
Vitorino
Vânia Fernandes

Y
Yolanda Soares

Z
Zeca Afonso
Zé Cabra

See also

List of Portuguese musicians
List of Portuguese bands

 
Singers
Portuguese